Curse was a network of gaming websites. The company was headquartered in Huntsville, Alabama, and had offices in San Francisco, New York City, Los Angeles, Brighton, and Berlin.

Curse initially focused on offering mods for various video games. As it expanded, the company began to develop and acquire gaming communities (particularly focusing on MMORPG titles such as World of Warcraft, as well as other games such as Minecraft), wikis, as well as offering voice chat services. The company also sponsored an eponymous eSports club, which competed primarily in League of Legends.

On August 16, 2016, Curse announced that it had agreed to be acquired by Amazon.com via its subsidiary Twitch Interactive for an undisclosed amount. On December 12, 2018, Fandom announced that they had acquired Curse's media assets, including its gaming community websites, Gamepedia wiki farm and D&D Beyond. The remainder of the company's assets stayed with Twitch. In the middle of 2020, CurseForge was sold from Twitch to Overwolf.

History

2006–2010 
Curse was born out of founder Hubert Thieblot's "hardcore" love of World of Warcraft. After leaving school, Thieblot began to turn his passion into a business, launching CurseBeta in 2006, offering up add-ons and modifications. In short order, the site exponentially increased in traffic and popularity.  As the funding for Curse increased, it proceeded to develop several high-profile sites in-house, while acquiring larger sites with already established communities and content, particularly for MMO games such as RuneScape.

2010–2014 
In 2011, Inc. 500 ranked Curse Inc. as the 405th fastest growing company in the United States, and the San Francisco Business Times ranked it 22nd in their list of the "Top 100 Fastest Growing Companies in the San Francisco Bay Area". On December 14, 2012, Curse officially launched the Gamepedia wiki farm.

In April 2012, Ernst & Young named Thieblot as a semifinalist in their "Ernst & Young Entrepreneur of the Year" program for Northern California. By June 2012, Curse's monthly worldwide traffic was reported by Quantcast as being in excess of 21 million unique visitors. On June 26, 2013, Curse announced in a press conference that it would relocate their chief headquarters to Huntsville, Alabama, leaving their sales office in San Francisco. On May 7, 2014, Curse introduced Curse Profiles, an integrated social media system in Gamepedia offering a wide range of features. The service allows users to add wikis to their favorites list, earn Wikipoints and Levels, display personal statistics (such as global editing leaderboards, number of edits, etc.), and change and set global preferences; the service also introduced a new user page system, a change from the MediaWiki standard user pages, including a new commenting system. Curse has expressed a long-term interest in expanding content and communities as their prime concern.

Acquisition by Amazon 
On August 16, 2016, Amazon.com Inc. announced via subsidiary Twitch Interactive that it would acquire Curse, Inc. for an undisclosed amount. In April 2017, the Curse desktop app was renamed to Twitch.

Acquisition by Fandom 
In December 2018, it was announced that Fandom, Inc. had reached an agreement to acquire Curse from Amazon.com for an undisclosed amount. This included Curse Media properties Gamepedia and D&D Beyond. This excluded BukkitDev, CurseForge, CurseForge Network and Union for Gamers, which remained Twitch's assets.

Twitch's sale of Curse Network and Union For Gamers to Magic Find 
In 2019 and 2020, Magic Find acquired Union For Gamers and Curse Network from Twitch.

Twitch's sale of CurseForge to Overwolf 
On June 22, 2020, Overwolf announced that it had acquired CurseForge from Twitch for an undisclosed amount. After November 30, 2020, the Twitch Desktop App no longer manages mods. CurseForge's mod management functionality can since be found in the CurseForge app, which is for Windows (Overwolf required) and macOS (Standalone, Overwolf not required). In June 2022, the standalone CurseForge app was released for Linux and Windows, starting with World of Warcraft support, later adding support for Minecraft: Java Edition.

Curse sites and services

CurseForge 
CurseForge is a service operated by Overwolf that hosts user generated content such as plugins, add-ons and mods for video games. CurseForge hosts content for Minecraft: Java Edition, World of Warcraft, The Sims 4, StarCraft II, and Kerbal Space Program, among other games. CurseForge offers authors their CurseForge Reward Program which allows authors to earn revenue using Author Reward Points that are allocated to a percentage of a monthly pool. CurseForge offers authors a 70% cut of revenue. CurseForge also features an app for Windows, macOS and Linux that allows users to easily download and install plugins, add-ons, and mods for some of the games it hosts mods for.

Curse Client 
Curse Client was an add-on and modification management service from Curse, with support for World of Warcraft, Runes of Magic, Rift, World of Tanks, The Elder Scrolls V: Skyrim, Minecraft, and Kerbal Space Program. The client functioned as a lightweight alternative to traditional add-on management tools, and features synchronization across multiple personal computers, add-on setting backups, and a privately developed security system. The client was supported by the CurseForge website, which allows for the uploading and reviewing of plugins, add-ons, and modifications.

Curse Voice 
Curse Voice was a Voice over IP (VoIP) client produced in-house by Curse. Intended to replace other VOIP solutions for games such as League of Legends, the client boasts a robust feature set, including an in-game voice overlay, an auto-match making service for automatically connecting you to the members of your team, and the use of URL links to join sessions. The client was originally rejected by Riot Games, who felt that the timers included for various spawn times could be considered cheating, but Curse has since removed the offending content and brought the software in line with the terms of service for League of Legends. The German version is still in the beta-phase. In 2015, Curse Voice initiated a PR campaign to show users, developers and publishers all of the benefits that the service had to offer. The service boasted how its safety features could help prevent users from getting swatted with Curse's CTO explaining how this was possible in an interview with Polygon. Other publications such as IGN, GameCrate, and Yahoo News picked up the story. On May 6, Curse reported on the growth of its VoIP service on GameSpot and Game Informer as it prepared to show off the service at E3 2015. In June 2015, Curse Voice made its way to not only Windows, but Mac and mobile, giving users more ways to use the service while on the go or at home. Publications like Kotaku and PC Gamer recommended using the service while playing online games like League of Legends. Consequentially, on July 7, SEC reports revealed that Riot Games had invested $30 million in Curse, but no further details were revealed at the time. The company had stated that they wanted to help games improve their in-game chat and many gamers speculated if maybe this was the case with the recent investment. Curse Voice has been proven to improve a game's community according to recent interviews with Smite and Robocraft alongside the release of the company's whitepaper. With all of these big gains in the Curse Voice Client, Curse officially announced the opening of a new headquarters for their VoIP service on September 10 to Irvine, California.

On March 16, 2017, Curse Voice and Curse Client was rebranded as the Twitch Desktop App. The Twitch Desktop app removed VOIP features in early 2019. On June 23, 2020, Overwolf announced the CurseForge app as a dedicated modding client following the removal of mod management from the Twitch Desktop App.

BukkitDev 
One of the larger sites in the CurseForge network, BukkitDev is a collection of Minecraft plugins for the Bukkit development platform, a platform which has become the de facto standard for Minecraft plugins within the last few years. As of May 2014, BukkitDev hosts 13,570 plugins and 8,337 unique users. The Bukkit system has proven so effective and widespread, that on February 28, 2012, Mojang, the makers of Minecraft, hired the developers to improve Minecraft's support of server and client modifications and plugins.

Kerbal CurseForge 
On May 6, 2014, CurseForge introduced Kerbal CurseForge as an official repository of modifications and add-ons for the popular game Kerbal Space Program On May 6, 2014, developers Squad announced the partnership; Squad COO Adrian Goya said of the service, “Modders have helped make Kerbal Space Program a more open, more rewarding game experience for our players. Curse is an important partner because their team is passionate and experienced in caring for and growing online game communities, such as our amazing playerbase for Kerbal Space Program.”
 
Additionally, Curse's Author Platform Evangelist Bryan McLemore stated, "We've got a great platform and a tremendous team that will be supporting the amazing modders for Kerbal Space Program. We also expect the millions of gamers who frequent Curse every month to see Kerbal Space Program as a great addition to our existing community." Kerbal CurseForge already boasts 94,300 downloads from its central repository.

Curse Network 
Curse owned and operated multiple high-traffic gaming websites, including Azurilland, Diablofans, Hearthpwn, MMO-Champion, Arena Junkies, Reign of Gaming, LoL Pro, Minecraft Forums, Guild Wars 2 Guru, and FPS General. Curse also acquired the first person shooter statistics and science website Symthic which focuses on the statistical analysis of data from FPS games, including such details as weight, accuracy, and weapon drift. Curse partnered in 2014 with GOG.com to provide a free game from their library for premium Curse members.

Gamepedia 
On December 14, 2012, Curse launched Gamepedia, a wiki hosting platform dedicated to video games and written by gamers. The site had since increased in popularity, with, as of April 2019, 1,293,790 contributors, 6,224,464 articles and 2,195 wikis. Gamepedia hosted a number of official wikis, which were endorsed and supported by the game developers themselves. High-profile wikis such as The Official Witcher Wiki, the Official Minecraft Wiki, The Official ARK: Survival Evolved Wiki, Dota 2 Wiki, Leaguepedia, COD Wiki, and Wowpedia had hundreds of thousands of edits across thousands of accounts. These wikis were also available in several languages.

On December 12, 2018, the ownership of Gamepedia was transferred to Fandom, the login services were merged with the Fandom login services around late-July early-August 2020. In early-2021 all Gamepedia wikis were in the process of being converted to the Unified Community Platform (UCP) with the FandomDesktop theme. By mid-2021, Gamepedia wikis migrated and the Gamepedia brand was retired in favor of Fandom's one.

Union for Gamers 
Curse partnered with YouTube content producer Athene in March 2012 for a YouTube partnership program and offered a wide range of features and tools.

Curse has stated that the Union for Gamers has a "user-first approach", offering 90% revenue share (where the content producer receives 90% of video profits), a non-capped contract (there is no maximum amount of money that could be paid out to content producers, unlike capped contracts, where, regardless of the amount your video earns, you can only earn up to a certain amount), no lock-in (content producers are free to terminate their contract whenever they choose), and no requirements for upload schedules or Curse endorsements.

Union for Gamers also offers several tools to content producers, arranged in a dashboard format. The dashboard includes summary boxes which track income, video data, referrals, and previous month comparisons, and a graph feature for revenue and traffic comparison. Tied into the dashboard is a referral system, allowing for additional income to be passively generated by referring parties. Additionally, Curse provides content producers with a knowledge database and support system, exclusive access to Curse logos and video clips.

From the Dashboard, users have access to all their videos, earnings break down, and a wide range of sounds and music provided by Epidemic Sound and AudioMicro.  In addition, they also have access to Epoxy, a one-stop-shop for their other social media accounts.  From there, they can upload new videos, or track their Twitter, Facebook, and Instagram accounts. Epidemic also helps create short clips of uploaded videos, pre-formatted to meet specific social media requirements.

, Curse is no longer accepting new channels into Union for Gamers.

YouTube 
Curse also produced videos in-house for their official YouTube channel. The lineup includes Curse Weekly Roundup, the Minecraft Update, the WoW Weekly Recap, the League Update, and the Pokémon Update. Curse also provides live coverage of game industry events including the Penny Arcade Expo, Gamescom, MineCon, BlizzCon, and the Eve Online Fanfest.

Curse historically broadcast livestreamed content on their Own3D channel until Own3D ceased operations as a company on January 31, 2013.

Team Curse 
Curse formerly sponsored a professional team, known collectively as Team Curse, that competed in League of Legends and Call of Duty, which in addition to various high-profile wins have garnered sponsorship from companies such as Nissan, Alienware, and Cooler Master.

In December 2014, it was announced that the team would drop the Curse name due to new League of Legends Championship Series sponsorship rules (in particular, Curse had wanted to have Curse Voice be a sponsor through other teams, which would prohibit it from being title sponsor of another team). It was ultimately announced in January 2015 that the Team Curse organization would merge into Team Liquid.

References 

Video game companies of the United States
Internet properties established in 2006
2006 establishments in California
Companies based in Huntsville, Alabama
Amazon (company) acquisitions
2016 mergers and acquisitions
2018 mergers and acquisitions
2020 mergers and acquisitions
Fandom (website)